1806-20 may refer to:

 a position in the sky,  
 1806-20 cluster, the star cluster containing SGR 1806-20
 LBV 1806-20, a luminous blue variable star
 SGR 1806-20, a soft gamma repeater pulsar
 A range of years from 1806 to 1820